Jayson Terdiman (born December 21, 1988) is an American luger. Terdiman competed at the 2014 Winter Olympics in Sochi, Russia where he finished 11th in the doubles luge competition with Christian Niccum. Following Niccum's retirement after the Olympics, Terdiman teamed up with Matthew Mortensen.

References

External links

1988 births
Living people
American male lugers
Olympic lugers of the United States
Lugers at the 2014 Winter Olympics
Lugers at the 2018 Winter Olympics
People from East Stroudsburg, Pennsylvania